
Gmina Stary Brus is a rural gmina (administrative district) in Włodawa County, Lublin Voivodeship, in eastern Poland.

The gmina contains part of the protected area called Polesie Landscape Park.

Villages
Gmina Stary Brus contains the villages and settlements of Dębina, Dominiczyn, Hola, Kamień, Kołacze, Kułaków, Laski Bruskie, Lubowierz, Marianka, Mietułka, Nowiny, Nowy Brus, Pieńki, Skorodnica, Stary Brus, Szmokotówka, Wielki Łan, Wołoskowola and Zamołodycze.

Neighbouring gminas
Gmina Stary Brus is bordered by the gminas of Dębowa Kłoda, Hańsk, Sosnowica, Urszulin and Wyryki.

References
Polish official population figures 2006

Stary Brus
Włodawa County